Battalion Parasol  was a Scouting battalion of the Armia Krajowa, the primary Polish resistance movement in World War II. It consisted primarily of members of the Gray Ranks. The battalion distinguished itself in numerous underground operations and took part in the Warsaw Uprising of 1944, as an element of the Radosław Group.

History
It was first organized as "Agat" ("Anti-Gestapo") unit by Adam Borys "Pług", a Cichociemni elite soldier parachuted from England in the fall of 1943. Due to arrest of Tadeusz Kostrzewski "Niemira" on 2 January 1944 it changed its name to "Pegaz" ("Przeciw Gestapo – Against the Gestapo"), and after another arrest it was reorganized as "Parasol" (umbrella) battalion. The last name referred to a parachute, as the unit was intended to join Polish 1st Independent Parachute Brigade in free Poland.

The battalion is renowned for its numerous military actions in 1943–1944. It organized assassination missions, targeting key Gestapo officers and high-ranking Nazi Germany officials who were responsible for extreme terror in the Warsaw District. One such mission was successfully carried out under the code name Operation Kutschera, which resulted in assassination of the SS and Police Leader Franz Kutschera, who was shot in the center of Warsaw (in front of the SS Headquarters) in February 1944.

Józef Szczepański, a poet, was among the commanders of this unit. The poet Krzysztof Kamil Baczyński fought in its ranks and was killed in action by a German sniper in the first few days of the Warsaw Uprising.

Heir to the tradition of the battalion is JW Komandosów and its detachment Zespół Bojowy C.

Notable members
 Krzysztof Kamil Baczyński
 Adam Borys
 Józef Szczepański
 Jerzy Zborowski

Losses during the Warsaw Uprising

References

External links

 Warsaw Uprising Witnesses: Battalion Parasol
 The Warsaw Rising Museum

Battalions of Poland
Military units and formations established in 1944
Units and formations of the Home Army
Special forces of Poland
Warsaw Uprising
Parasol
Scouting and Guiding in Poland
Military units and formations disestablished in 1944